Center-South («Центр-Юг», "Tsentr-Yug") was a Russian passenger airline based in Belgorod.

History 
In early 2014, the airline received the first of two Sukhoi Superjet 100 aircraft, which is due to be operated under a lease agreement for AtlasJet on charter flights. The airline is the official carrier of the volleyball club VC Lokomotiv-Belogorie.

On 17 September 2015, Rosaviation announced the suspension of Centre-South Airlines' operating certificate due to several violations. Following the rules, if the airline plans to have a wide range of flights (as Center-South has), it needs to have not less than 8 aircraft with capacity of not less than 50 people, however, the airline has only five aircraft of the required type, including two Tupolev Tu-134 and three Sukhoi Superjet 100. Plus the aircraft were not checked for damages.

Destinations

Fleet 

The Center-South fleet comprises the following aircraft (as of August 2016):

The airline fleet previously included the following aircraft:
 2 Yakovlev Yak-40

References

External links 

Official website

Defunct airlines of Russia
Airlines established in 1993
1993 establishments in Russia
Companies based in Belgorod Oblast